TMAP or TMap may refer to:
 Tactile Map Automated Production, a web application for creating tactile maps for braille embossers
 Teenage Magazine Arbitration Panel
 Test Management Approach, an approach to the structured testing of software products
 Texas Medication Algorithm Project, a decision-tree medical algorithm